Matthias Berking (born 30 April 1971 in Pittsburgh, Pennsylvania) is a professor of psychology and a psychotherapist at the University of Erlangen.

Field of research 
Berking's field of research is the regulation of emotion.

Selected works

German publications 
 Berking, M.: Training emotionaler Kompetenzen (3. Aufl). Springer, Heidelberg 2014, 
 Berking, M. & Rief, W. (Publ.): Klinische Psychologie und Psychotherapie. Band I Grundlagen und Störungswissen. Springer, Heidelberg 2012, 
 Berking, M. & Rief, W. (Publ.): Klinische Psychologie und Psychotherapie. Band II: Therapieverfahren. Springer, Heidelberg 2012, 
 Berking, M. & Heizer, K.: Förderung emotionaler Kompetenzen. In: W. Lutz (Publ.). Lehrbuch Psychotherapie. Huber, Bern 2010, 
 Berking, M.: Therapieziele. In: G. H. Paar, F. Lamprecht, R. Meermann, S. Wiegand-Grefe, G. Schmid-Ott & C. Jacobi (Publ.). Leitlinien für die Psychosomatische Rehabilitation (S. 287-291). Schattauer, Stuttgart 2008

English publications 
 Berking, M. & Lukas, C.: The Affect Regulation Training (ART): A Transdiagnostic Approach to the Prevention and Treatment of Mental Disorders. In: Current Opinion in Psychology, 3, 2015, S. 64-69. (IF: noch nicht veröffentlicht)
 Berking, M. & Whitley, B.: Affect Regulation Training (ART). New York: Springer, New York 2014, 
 Berking, M. & Schwarz, J.: The Affect Regulation Training. In: Gross, J. J. Handbook of emotion regulation (529-547). Guilford, New York 2013, 
 Berking, M., Wirtz, C., Svaldi, J., & Hofmann, S.: Emotion-regulation predicts depression over five years. In: Behaviour Research and Therapy, 57, 2014, 13-20.  (IF 4.13)
 Berking, M., Ebert, D., Cuijpers, P., & Hofmann, S.G.: Emotion-regulation skills training enhances the efficacy of cognitive behavioral therapy for major depressive disorder. In: Psychotherapy and Psychosomatics, 82, 2013, 234-245.  (IF: 7.23)

References

External links 
 Training Emotional Competence
 Affect Regulation Training program online
 FAU Psychology Faculty Page
 CV Matthias Berking

1971 births
American psychotherapists
Living people
American expatriates in Germany